The 1933 Kentucky Wildcats football team was an American football team that represented the University of Kentucky as a member of the Southeastern Conference (SEC) during the 1933 college football season. In their seventh and final season under head coach Harry Gamage, the Wildcats compiled an overall record of 5–5 record with a mark of 2–3 against conference opponents, tied for ninth place in the SEC, and were outscored by a total of 116 to 91. The team played its home games at McLean Stadium in Lexington, Kentucky.

Schedule

References

Kentucky
Kentucky Wildcats football seasons
Kentucky Wildcats football